Rangers Women's Football Club is a women's football team that plays in the Scottish Women's Premier League, the top division of women's football in Scotland. The team is affiliated with Rangers F.C. in Glasgow, uses the club's training facilities at Auchenhowie, and wears the club's colours.

History
Paisley City Ladies F.C., formerly Arthurlie Ladies F.C., was founded at the start of the 1999–00 season. As a new club they started in the lowest division, the third. In 2001–02 they played in Division 1, directly under the Premier Division, and stayed there until 2008. In the 2007–08 season they suffered financial problems, and began to search for a partnership with another club.

Rangers L.F.C. was founded in 2008, as Rangers followed the example of Celtic, Hibernian and Aberdeen in developing a women's section. The formation of the team involved a partnership with Paisley City Ladies. Former Rangers youth academy coach Drew Todd was brought in to coach the team. Scotland player Jayne Sommerville was signed as the new team's first captain.

They took the place of Paisley City in the Scottish Women's First Division and many players switched too. Rangers won the league in their debut season. They also reached the final of the Scottish Women's Cup but lost 5–0 to Glasgow City; they were the first side playing in a lower division to reach the final.

Former East Stirlingshire footballer Scott Allison was appointed manager in 2010. The club reached the Cup final again but were beaten 2–1 by Hibernian.

In May 2011, Alana Marshall became the first female Rangers player to be called up by the senior Scotland team.

In February 2012, The Herald newspaper reported that the financial crisis engulfing Rangers also threatened the existence of the club's women's section. The team continued to operate, and ended the 2014 SWPL season with a second place finish, the club's best result so far.

Ahead of the 2018 season, the official name of the team was changed to 'Rangers Women' from the previous 'Rangers Ladies'. In July 2019, the club announced a significant commitment to women's football by integrating their teams more fully into its operations and providing further financial support with the aim of becoming professional. To this end, the incumbent coach Amy McDonald was installed in a new position as Women's Manager, with former player and youth trainer Grégory Vignal appointed as head coach of the senior team. A few months later the team moved their home fixtures to the Rangers Training Centre in Milngavie following improvements made to its facilities, having previously been using New Tinto Park (home of Benburb F.C.) in the Govan area of Glasgow, near to the club's Ibrox Stadium. 
In January 2020 Malky Thomson was appointed joint first-team coach alongside Vignal, in June of the same year Vignal left the club Thomson was named head of the women's first team. In 2022, an arrangement was reached to play home fixtures at Broadwood Stadium in Cumbernauld, due to capacity and parking issues at the training venue.

Current squad

Out on loan

Former players
For details of former players, see :Category:Rangers W.F.C. players.

Coaching staff

Season-by-season records

European History

Honours
Scottish Women's Premier League: 2021–22
Runners-up: 2014
 Scottish Women's First Division: 2009
 Scottish Cup: Runners-up 2009, 2010
 Scottish Women's Premier League Cup 2022
City of Glasgow Woman's Cup: 2022

See also
Old Firm

References

External links
 Fixture list on Rangers website
 Soccerway 

 
Women's football clubs in Scotland
Ladies
2008 establishments in Scotland
Govan
Football clubs in Glasgow
Scottish Women's Premier League clubs
Association football clubs established in 2008